Skënder Rizaj (Serbian: Скендер Ризај, Skender Rizaj) (14 March 1930 – 28 November 2021) was a Kosovar Albanian scholar and historian born in Peja, Kingdom of Yugoslavia). He specialised in the Ottoman period of Balkan's history.

Career
Rizaj earned his BA in History from Skopje University in 1956 and his doctorate from Sarajevo University in 1965. He was one of the founders of the Department of History of the University of Pristina, where he taught from 1965 until he retired in 1987. He also worked as a Special Consultant for Turkish State Archives in Istanbul from 1989 to 1990. In 2010, Rizaj was awarded as "Educator Emeritus" by the Kosovan government.

Works
Rizaj undertook extensive research in Turkish Archives in Istanbul, and the British Library in London. During his studies, he mastered Serbian language, Ottoman Turkish, as well as modern Turkish language and English. He has written extensively on Albanian history, with an emphasis on Kosovo. His research gave him enough scientific material to produce several books, most prominent his 1982 book "Kosovo during the 15th, 16th, and 17th centuries" in which he emphasizes that Kosovo was dominated by ethnic Albanians during and after the Middle Ages, 

He also wrote a university textbook " History of the New Era (1453-1789)", published in 1985.

Publications

Rizaj's most notable publications include:

Mining in Kosovo and surrounding regions from the 15th to 17th Centuries (Doctoral Dissertation), Pristina, 1968
The Albanian League of Prizren in English Documents, 1878-1881, Pristina, 1978
Kosovo during the 15th, 16th, and 17th Centuries, Rilindja Publishing, Pristina, 1982
History of New Era 1453-1789, University of Pristina Textbook, 1985
The Albanians and the Serbs in Kosovo, Zeri i Rinise Publishing, Pristina, 1991
Kosova and Albanians, Yesterday, Today and Tomorrow, Pristina, 1992
Kosova, Albanians and Turks, Yesterday, Today and Tomorrow, Yayinevi Publishing, Istanbul, Turkey, 1993
English Documents on the Albanian League of Prizren and the start of the Disintegration of the Balkans, 1877-1885, Pristina, 1996
The Albanian's Historical Right to Self-Determination, Pristina, 2005
The Falsifications of Serbian Historiography, Pristina, 2006

References

External links
 Forumi Shqiptar
 Pellazget Hyjnore

1930 births
2021 deaths
Kosovan historians
Yugoslav historians
Ss. Cyril and Methodius University of Skopje alumni
University of Sarajevo alumni
Academic staff of the University of Pristina
Writers from Peja
Yugoslav Albanians
Date of birth missing